Guanyinsi Subdistrict is a subdistrict in the northern portion of Daxing District, Beijing, China. It is located at the south and west of Xihongmen Town, north of Tiangongyuan Subdistrict and Huangcun Town, northeast of Xingfeng and Linxiao Road Subdistricts, and east of Qingyuan and Gaomidian Subdistricts. In the year 2020, it had a total population of 111,225.

The name of this subdistrict is referring to a temple dedicated to Guanyin within its borders.

History

Administrative divisions 

In 2021, Guanyinsi Subdistrict comprised 21 communities:

See also 

 List of township-level divisions of Beijing

References 

Daxing District
Subdistricts of Beijing